The Willisau Concert is a live album by multi-instrumentalist and composer Joe McPhee, recorded in 1975 it was the second album released on the Swiss HatHut label.

Reception

Allmusic rated the album with four stars.

Track listing 
All compositions by Joe McPhee
 "Touchstone" - 12:30
 "Voices" - 11:30
 "Bahamian Folksong" - 16:20
 "Harriet" - 9:40

Personnel 
Joe McPhee - tenor saxophone, soprano saxophone
 John Snyder - synthesizer, voice
Makaya Ntshoko - drums

References 

Joe McPhee live albums
1976 live albums
Hathut Records live albums